A minor god in Greek mythology, attested mainly by Athenian writers, Aristaeus (Aristaios (Aristaîos); lit. “Most Excellent, Most Useful”), was the culture hero credited with the discovery of many rural useful arts and handicrafts, including bee-keeping; he was the son of the huntress Cyrene and Apollo.

Aristeus ("the best") was a cult title in many places: Boeotia, Arcadia, Ceos, Sicily, Sardinia, Thessaly, and Macedonia; consequently a set of "travels" was imposed, connecting his epiphanies in order to account for these widespread manifestations.

If Aristaeus was a minor figure at Athens, he was more prominent in Boeotia, where he was "the pastoral Apollo", and was linked to the founding myth of Thebes by marriage with Autonoë, daughter of Cadmus, the founder. Aristaeus may appear as a winged youth in painted Boeotian pottery, similar to representations of the Boreads, spirits of the North Wind. Besides Actaeon and Macris, he also was said to have fathered Charmus and Callicarpus in Sardinia.

Pindar's account
According to Pindar's ninth Pythian Ode and Apollonius' Argonautica (II.522ff), Cyrene despised spinning and other womanly arts and instead spent her days hunting and shepherding, but, in a prophecy he put in the mouth of the wise centaur Chiron, Apollo would spirit her to Libya and make her the foundress of a great city, Cyrene, in a fertile coastal plain. When Aristaeus was born, according to what Pindar sang, Hermes took him to be raised on nectar and ambrosia and to be made immortal by Gaia.

"Aristaios" ("the best") is an epithet rather than a name:For some men to call Zeus and holy Apollo.Agreus and Nomios, and for others Aristaios (Pindar)

Patronage
Thanks to a vast family-tree and connections, Aristaeus is a god and patron of a wide array of rustic and rural arts, crafts, skills, practices and traditions (handicrafts), some-of-which is overlapped with his many relatives:  
 From his father, Apollo, the wise Centaur, Chiron and from his aunts, the Muses, Aristaeus learned the arts of prophecy, healing and herblore (similarly like his half-brother, Asclepius).  
 From his aunt, Artemis and from his mother, Cyrene (who was also a companion of his aunt, Artemis, either as a nymph or as a mortal princess-turned-nymph), Aristaeus learned how to track, hunt and trap animals, and how to dress and prepare their meat (Butchering) and skins (Leather making), as well as the use of nets and traps in hunting.  
 From the Myrtle-nymphs (being, either Dryads or Oreads), who raised him on Apollo's behalf, Aristaeus learned other useful arts and mysteries, such as dairying; how to prepare milk for cream, butter, oxygala (similar to yogurt) and cheese(making); how to keep chickens for their eggs; how to tame the Goddess's bees and keep them in hives (the bees either belonging to the Myrtle-nymphs-themselves or the Thriae), to harness supplies of honey and beeswax, etc.; how to tame and cultivate the wild oleaster in order to make it bear olives and how to process them into olive oil (like his aunt, Athena); as-such, Aristaeus is a protector of olive trees, of olive plantations, olive cultivation and of olive oil presses (whereas Athena is the goddess of olives, of olive-oil and of olive-oil-making).  
 Like his father, Apollo, his mother, Cyrene (a huntress and a shepherdess), his uncle, Hermes, and his cousin(?), Pan, Aristaeus is also a patron god and a protector of shepherds/herders and of herding, patron of the art of Sheep shearing, as-well-as the patron god of pastoralism; of the cattle and their herds and flocks, and protector of pastures.  
 From his nephew, Dionysus, Aristaeus learned the processes of how to produce alcoholic beverages, such as wine, ale, beer, kykeon, mead, kumis, absinthe, etc. (although an alternate account states that he was the one who taught Dionysus, having served as a surrogate father to him on the island of Euboia (as-opposed to Dionysus learning about winemaking from the wise old Satyr, Silenus)); as-such, Aristaeus is worshipped as a protector of grapevines and of vineyards, and of viticulture, while Dionysus is the god of wine and of wine-making.  
 From his great-aunt, Demeter, Aristaeus learned the skills of the various branches of agriculture, horticulture, fungiculture and animal husbandry; as-such, Aristaeus was also a protector of gardens, farms, fields and orchards, etc.  
 Aristaeus is also a patron god of fruit trees & vegetable plants, herbs and spices (along with Carpo of the Horae and Karpos (son of Zephyrus/Favonius and Chloris/Flora)), and a patron god of the arts foraging, hunting & fishing, husbandry & agriculture, and of the arts of food preservation (fermenting, pickling, brining, curing, smoking and drying of foodstuffs).  
 From his aunt, Athena (also), Aristaeus learned the skills to weave, making him the patron of ropemaking, net-making and basket weaving, and of carding and hand spinning fibres into wool, thread, etc.  
 From his uncle, Hephaestus, Aristaeus learned the ways of working with metal (mining, blacksmithing and metalworking, etc.), stone (quarrying and stonemasonry, etc.), clay (pottery and ceramics, etc.) and wood (woodworking, etc.), etc.  
 In Ceos, Aristaeus is also a god of the Etesian winds, which provided some respite from the intense heat of their scorching, drought-causing midsummers weather/climate.

Issue
When he was grown, he sailed from Libya to Boeotia, where he was inducted into further mysteries in the cave of Chiron the centaur. In Boeotia, he was married to Autonoë and became the father of the ill-fated Actaeon, who inherited the family passion for hunting, to his ruin, and of Macris, who nursed the child Dionysus.

According to Pherecydes, Aristaeus fathered Hecate, goddess of witchcraft, crossroads, and the night. Hesiod's Theogony suggests her parents were Perses and Asteria.

Aristaeus in Ceos
Aristaeus' presence in Ceos, attested in the fourth and third centuries BC, was attributed to a Delphic prophecy that counselled Aristaeus to sail to Ceos, where he would be greatly honored. He found the islanders suffering from sickness under the stifling and baneful effects of the Dog-Star Sirius at its first appearance before the sun's rising, in early July. In the foundation legend of a specifically Cean weather-magic ritual, Aristaeus was credited with the double sacrifice that countered the deadly effects of the Dog-Star, a sacrifice at dawn to Zeus Ikmaios, "Rain-making Zeus" at a mountaintop altar, following a pre-dawn chthonic sacrifice to Sirius, the Dog-Star, at its first annual appearance, which brought the annual relief of the cooling Etesian winds.

In a development that offered more immediate causality for the myth, Aristaeus discerned that the Ceans' troubles arose from murderers hiding in their midst, the killers of Icarius in fact. When the miscreants were found out and executed, and a shrine erected to Zeus Ikmaios, the great god was propitiated and decreed that henceforth, the Etesian wind should blow and cool all the Aegean for forty days from the baleful rising of Sirius, but the Ceans continued to propitiate the Dog-Star, just before its rising, just to be sure. Aristaeus appears on Cean coins.

Then Aristaeus, on his civilizing mission, visited Arcadia, where the winged male figure who appears on ivory tablets in the sanctuary of Ortheia as the consort of the goddess, has been identified as Aristaeus by L. Marangou.

Aristaeus settled for a time in the Vale of Tempe. By the time of Virgil's Georgics, the myth has Aristaeus chasing Eurydice when she was bitten by a serpent and died.

Aristaeus and the bees
Soon after Aristaeus' inadvertent hand in the death of Eurydice, his bees became sickened and began to die.  Seeking council, first from his mother, Cyrene, and then from Proteus, Aristaeus learns that the bees' death was a punishment for causing the death of Eurydice, from her sisters, the Auloniad nymphes. To make amends, Aristaeus needed to sacrifice 12 animals (or four bulls and four cows) to the gods, and in memory of Eurydice, leave the carcasses in the place of sacrifice, and to return 3-days later. He followed these instructions, establishing sacrificial alters before a fountain, as advised, sacrificed the aforementioned cattle, and left their carcasses.  Upon returning 3-days later, Aristaeus found within one of the carcasses new swarms of bees, which he took back to his apiary. The bees were never again troubled by disease.  

A variation of this tale was told in the 2002 novel by Sue Monk Kidd, The Secret Life of Bees.

"Aristaeus" as a name
In later times, Aristaios was a familiar Greek name, borne by several archons of Athens and attested in inscriptions.

See also
 The Thriae, Ancient Greek goddesses of bees
 Bee (mythology), Bees in mythology
 USS Aristaeus (ARB-1)
 Fu Xi, an important culture hero from the Chinese mythology who bears some strong resemblances to Aristaios as a teacher of mortals
 Aegipan
 Pan (god)

References

External links

 Aristaeus, on Theoi Project

Greek gods
Food gods
Food deities
Beekeeping
Animal gods
Greek mythological heroes
Religion in ancient Boeotia
Children of Apollo
Kea (island)
Hunting gods
Deeds of Gaia